InkyPen is a subscription based comics and manga reading application on the Nintendo Switch, launched worldwide in most regions on December 17, 2018. Developed by a Norwegian startup company located in Norway also under the name of InkyPen.

History 
InkyPen developers attended GDC before launch on March 20, 2018. InkyPen launched on the Nintendo Switch on December 17, 2018, being one of the few non-gaming application launched on the Nintendo Switch

InkyPen launched update 1.2.0 on March 16, 2020, allowing for reading in vertical mode while including performance updates.

InkyPen partnered with Kodansha USA on April 27, 2020 to provide manga through the InkyPen service. They also partnered with Rain Games and Studio Foglio to announce that InkyPen will assist Rain Games in adding a comics reader to the announced Girl Genius: Adventures in Castle Heterodyne video game. This arrangement also allowed for the Girl Genius comics to be freely readable on InkyPen.

Partnerships 
InkyPen has comics from publishers, Valiant Comics, Dynamite, IDW, Titan Comics, Humanoids Inc, Archie Comics, Studio Foglio, Dark Horse Comics, Andrews Mcmeel Universal, Papercutz, Daniel Lieske, Zilo Media, TPub Comics, Ubisoft Entertainment, Soaring Penguin Press, Snowcastle Games.

References

External links 

 Official Website
 Application on Nintendo Switch Website

Media readers